The Wonderful Wizard of Oz is a feature length 115 minute film. It was produced by Teaching Resource Films in 1975. It is an adaptation of the 1900 children's novel The Wonderful Wizard of Oz, written by L. Frank Baum. It was a color film made in the United States, and has additional writing credits given to Katherine Jose and Irene Lewis. It is a collection of filmstrips narrated on records.

External links 
 

1975 films
Films based on The Wizard of Oz
1970s fantasy films
1970s English-language films
American fantasy films
1970s American films